John Williams (1828 – October 3, 1886) was a Union Navy sailor in the American Civil War who received the U.S. military's highest decoration, the Medal of Honor, for his actions at the Battle of Mathias Point.

Military service

Williams was born in 1828 in New Orleans, Louisiana.

On June 27, 1861, Williams was among two small boats of men sent from Pawnee to assist  in attacking a Confederate force at Mathias Point on the Potomac River in Virginia. After skirmishers and artillery fire from Thomas Freeborn cleared the point, men from the small boats landed and attempted to build fortifications. However, a strong counter-attack by the Confederates forced the landing party to retreat under heavy fire. In charge of one of the boats, Williams ordered his men to stay near shore until all members of the party were aboard, declaring that "every man must die on his thwart sooner than leave a man behind". Williams was shot in the thigh and the boat's flag had its staff shot away, after which he held the flag up until the boat reached Thomas Freeborn. All members of the landing party were successfully evacuated.

For this action, Williams was awarded the Medal of Honor nearly two years later on April 3, 1863. His was the earliest action for which a Navy Medal of Honor was awarded, but he was not the first to receive the medal. Several Navy men who performed later actions were awarded the medal before him, the first being Robert Williams.

Williams is buried at Mount Moriah Cemetery (Naval Plot) Naval  1, Row 4, Grave 14, Yeadon, PA  GPS: 39.93654* N, 075.23911*

Medal of Honor citation 
Rank and organization: Captain of the Maintop, U.S. Navy. Accredited to: Louisiana. G.O. No.: 11, 3 April 1863.

Williams's official Medal of Honor citation reads:
Serving as captain of the maintop of the U.S.S. Pawnee in the attack upon Mathias Point, 26 June 1861, Williams told his men, while lying off in the boat, that every man must die on his thwart sooner than leave a man behind. Although wounded by a musket ball in the thigh he retained the charge of his boat; and when the staff was shot away, held the stump in his hand, with the flag, until alongside the Freeborn.

Notes

References 

1828 births
1886 deaths
Burials at Mount Moriah Cemetery (Philadelphia)
People from New Orleans
People of Louisiana in the American Civil War
Union Navy sailors
United States Navy Medal of Honor recipients
American Civil War recipients of the Medal of Honor